Protestants represent 13% of the population of Chile. According to a 2018 study, they represent 11% of the population. Protestants first arrived in the 1840s, with the arrival in Valparaíso in 1845 of the American Congregationalist (later, Presbyterian) missionary David Trumbull and with German immigrants from Protestant parts of Germany, mainly Lutherans.  Later came Anglicans, Presbyterians, Seventh-day Adventists, Methodists, Pentecostals, and other Protestant Christians.

The first Seventh-Day Adventist missionaries first arrived in 1895. Today there are estimated 126,814 Adventists in Chile.

References

 
Chile